Hibbertia acicularis, commonly known as prickly guinea-flower, is a species of flowering plant in the family Dilleniaceae and is endemic to eastern Australia. It is an erect or prostrate shrub with linear to lance-shaped leaves and yellow flowers arranged singly in leaf axils with the six to eight stamens joined at the base, in a single cluster.

Description
The six to eight stamens are joined at the base in a single cluster, all on one side of the two carpels. The carpels are velvety to woolly hairy and there are usually two ovules per carpel. Flowering occurs from September to December.

Taxonomy
Prickly guinea-flower was first formally described in 1806 by Jacques Labillardière who gave it the name Pleurandra acicularis in his book Novae Hollandiae Plantarum Specimen. In 1862, Ferdinand von Mueller changed the name to Hibbertia acicularis in his book The Plants Indigenous to the Colony of Victoria. The specific epithet (acicularis) means "needle-pointed".

Distribution and habitat
Hibbertia acicularis grows in heath, woodland and forest in south-eastern Queensland, the coast and tablelands of New South Wales, east of Port Phillip Bay in Victoria, and in Tasmania.

See also
List of Hibbertia species

References

acicularis
Flora of Queensland
Flora of New South Wales
Flora of Victoria (Australia)
Flora of Tasmania
Plants described in 1806
Taxa named by Jacques Labillardière